, there were about 150,000 electric vehicles registered in Texas.

Government policy

In November 2013, the Texas Commission on Environmental Quality approved a rebate program to provide financial incentives up to $2,500 for the purchase or lease of new eligible vehicles powered by compressed natural gas (CNG), liquefied petroleum gas (LPG), or plug-in electric drive with battery capacity larger than 4 kWh, from a licensed dealer or leasing company. The program was in effect from May 13, 2014 until June 26, 2015.

, the state government offers tax rebates of $2,500 for electric vehicle purchases.

, the state government charges a $150 annual registration fee for electric vehicles.

Charging stations
, there were about 2,500 public charging station locations in Texas.

, charging stations are not considered electric utilities or providers for the purposes of state government regulation.

The Infrastructure Investment and Jobs Act, signed into law in November 2021, allocated  to be spent on charging stations in Texas.

There have been concerns about the reliability of Texas's electrical grid with regards to charging electric vehicles.

Public opinion
In a poll conducted in March 2022 by Texas 2036 about how many registered voters "have bought or considered buying" an electric vehicle, the number of affirmative respondents was 53% for people age 18–34, 56% for age 35–44, 34% for age 45–54, and 20% for age 55+.

By region

Amarillo
, there were around six public charging stations in Amarillo.

Austin
, Austin has the highest number of electric vehicles and charging stations of any Texas metropolitan area. , there were about 18,000 electric vehicles registered in Travis County.

, there were about 1,300 charging stations in Austin. Nationwide, the region ranks fourth in terms of the amount of electric vehicle infrastructure.

Beaumont–Port Arthur
, there were five public charging stations in Jefferson County.

Dallas–Fort Worth
, there were about 13,000 electric vehicles in Dallas County, 11,000 in Collin County, 9,000 in Tarrant County, 7,000 in Denton County, 700 in Rockwall County, 500 in Ellis County, 400 in Parker County, 400 in Johnson County, 300 in Kaufman County, 140 in Hunt County, and 110 in Wise County.

, electric vehicle automaker Rivian has plans to open a manufacturing facility in southwest Tarrant County. If opened, the facility would be the largest car manufacturing facility in the state.

El Paso
, there were about 1,800 electric vehicles registered in El Paso County. , the county had 66 charging stations.

Houston
, there were about 19,000 electric vehicles in Harris County, with about 13,000 being registered in the city of Houston.

, the Houston city government had 40 electric cars in its fleet. The city plans to transition all of its light-duty vehicles to electric by 2030.

In August 2021, Houston Metro announced its intentions to transition the agency's bus fleet to all-electric by 2030.

Laredo
, there were 264 electric vehicles registered in Webb County.

Longview
, there were 205 electric vehicles registered in Gregg County.

Lubbock
, there were 709 electric vehicles registered in Lubbock County.

, there were around six public charging stations in Lubbock.

Midland
, there were 205 electric vehicles registered in Midland County.

San Angelo
, there were seven public charging stations in San Angelo.

San Antonio
San Antonio opened its first AC level 2 charging station in September 2021.

Tyler
, there were 538 electric vehicles registered in Smith County.

Waco
, there were five fully electric vehicles in the Waco city fleet.

References

Road transportation in Texas
Texas